Soon After Silence is the sixth studio album from the Australian electronica artist Endorphin, released in 2007.

Track listing
"Lila"
"Brooklyn"
"Every Moment"
"Soon After Silence"
"Angels"
"Gate 23"
"Spring Interlude"
"Point Blank"
"Touch"
"Night-time Butterfly"
"Bastille"
"Dawn"
"Shibuya"
"Glenrowan"

External links
 Official website
 [ Soon After Silence] at allmusic

2007 albums
Endorphin (Australian band) albums